Paulhan may refer to:

People
 Frédéric Paulhan (1856–1931), French philosopher
 Jean Paulhan (1884–1968), French writer
 Louis Paulhan (1883–1963), French aviator

Places
 Paulhan, Hérault department, Occitanie, France

Other
 Paulhan biplane, French experimental aircraft